Hank the Tank is a five-hundred pound American black bear that lives in Tahoe Keys, California. Hank became notable when newspapers, using the words "ransack" and "rampage," reported that he was breaking into Lake Tahoe houses in search of food and causing property damage. The California Department of Fish and Wildlife said that Hank has lost his fear of people.

At one point, he stood accused of breaking into thirty houses, but DNA evidence later showed that the thirty break ins were the work of at least three different bears.

In February 2022, there was some talk of euthanizing Hank, though the California Department of Fish and Wildlife said that would only be a last resort. However, when Fish and Wildlife discovered that Hank was not solely responsible for the home invasions in Tahoe Keys, the department embarked on a program of tagging and doing DNA analysis on the region's bears. No bears would be killed during this process, the department promised.

Three wildlife sanctuaries offered a home to Hank while the California Department of Fish and Wildlife was conducting a search for the bear. A wildlife advocacy group, the BEAR League, promised to pay all expenses involved in relocating the bear. Ann Bryant, BEAR's executive director, said that locals do not want the bear killed. "Long-time residents of Lake Tahoe know how to live in harmony with bears, who all have names," Bryant said. Bryant blames Hank's invasive behavior on an influx of new homeowners who bought into Lake Tahoe because of the work at home movement, driven by COVID-19. "These newcomers do not secure their garbage, leave food in their cars, and leave doors and windows open," she said.

Because he has year-round access to food, Hank does not hibernate, according to Bryant, who notes that at least twenty percent of the bears around Lake Tahoe no longer hibernate because of the easy availability of human food.

See also
 List of individual bears

References  

Lake Tahoe
Individual bears
Individual wild animals